Aygevan; formerly Sovkhoz Nomer Shest – (Russian for "Sovkhoz number six"), later Imeni Stalina, later Dzerzhinski and Imeni Dzerzhinskogo, is a village in the Armavir Province of Armenia. It was founded as a state farm in 1946 and named after Felix Dzerzhinski, head of the Soviet secret police.

See also 
Armavir Province

References

World Gazeteer: Armenia – World-Gazetteer.com

Populated places in Armavir Province
Populated places established in 1946
Cities and towns built in the Soviet Union
1946 establishments in the Soviet Union